The Last Goodbye to Mama is a 2021 Chinese drama streaming television series directed by Cao Dun and Jing Chong, and starring Dong Jie, Yin Fang, Lu Fangsheng and Wang Churan. The story revolves around a mother and her son in the little town of Subei, spanning thirty years. It was aired on Youku, IQIYI and Tencent Video from October 13 to November 10, 2021.

Plot
Ding Xiaojun (Yin Fang), who has lived with his mother Ding Biyun (Dong Jie) in a small city in the north of Jiangsu since childhood, was accepted into a university in Shanghai at the age of 18. Warning about failure to graduate. Ding Xiaojun hid from his mother until he had an accident and met Yu Ya. At the same time, with the encouragement of his mother, Ding Xiaojun encouraged his spirit and graduated excellently. Ding Xiaojun became a Shanghai drifter, but was tricked into going to Japan to experience "the vagrant life" for several months. He realizes that his mother's life is not easy, and returns to China after reconciling with her mother by crossing the ocean. On New Year's Eve 2010, Ding Xiaojun received a job offer from a Beijing company, and his long-planned trip to Shanghai will also come to fruition. He arranged for Yu Ya and his mother to meet in Shanghai, hoping to take this opportunity to say goodbye to the old days and welcome the new to his vibrant youth. Draw a complete landing. But on this day, the two most important women will leave him, especially his mother Ding Biyun, who was diagnosed with tumor and bone metastasis. Since then, Ding Xiaojun gave up wandering and broke up with Yu Ya, and returned to his mother.....

Cast

Main 
Dong Jie as Ding Biyun
Yin Fang as Ding Xiaojun 
Gu Wenze as Ding Xiaojun (young)

Supporting 
Lu Fangsheng as Hai Zhong
Zhao Wei as Fu Qiang
Cai Lu as Ding Jianhua
Chen Yuwen as Yin Yi
Jiang Xueming as Xu Tian
Wang Churan as Yu Ya
Qu Shanshan as Ding Bixia
Gong Lei as Pang Hu's father
Zhang Yao as Cui Shanshan 
Du Shuangyu
Zeng Qi as Fang Fang
Ran Xu as Qin Keran
Gong Zhengye as Wu Hua

Reception
The Last Goodbye to Mama received mainly positive reviews. Douban gave the drama 8.1 out of 10.

Luo Jianhui, former director of the National Radio and Television Administration and vice president of the China Netcasting Services Association (CNSA), stated: "The Last Goodbye to Mama is an "enjoyable" TV series, which has created a glorious image of Chinese women with traditional virtues" Dong Jie's performance also received a lot of praise for playing an emotional mother while she and Yin Fang (the actor who played Ding Biyun's son - Ding Xiaojun) had only 6 years apart. The series was also commended for its parallel storytelling that intertwines past and present, as scenes narrate the dual life of the 1980s and life in the society of the 1990s.

Broadcast

References

External links

2021 Chinese television series debuts
2021 Chinese television series endings
2021 web series debuts
Chinese television series
Chinese drama television series
Chinese web series
Mandarin-language television shows
Youku original programming